Estadio Misael Delgado is a multi-use stadium in Valencia, Venezuela.  It is currently used mostly for football matches and is the home stadium of Carabobo FC.  The stadium holds 10,400 people (all seaters) and was reopened in 2001 (last remodel). The stadium hosted the 1994 South American Games.

References

Misael Delgado
Buildings and structures in Carabobo